The Hamilton Tigers won their first Grey Cup title over the Parkdale Canoe Club.

Canadian Football News in 1913
The Hamilton Tigers played four exhibition matches in Western Canada, defeating Winnipeg 26–1, Regina 26–4, Moose Jaw 25–1 and Calgary 19–2. This is the first documented East-West series of games.

On September 6, the Hamilton Alerts applied for reinstatement in the ORFU under the name of the East Hamilton Athletic Association, but the request was denied. The Hamilton Rowing Club, however, was accepted.

Source:

Regular season

Final regular season standings
Note: GP = Games Played, W = Wins, L = Losses, T = Ties, PF = Points For, PA = Points Against, Pts = Points
*Bold text means that they have clinched the playoffs

League Champions

Grey Cup playoffs
Note: All dates in 1913

MRFU semifinal

MRFU final

Winnipeg Rowing Club wins the MRFU championship

ARFU final

Edmonton Eskimos wins the ARFU championship

Western semifinal

Western Final - MRFU–SRFU Inter-League Playoff

ORFU Playoff

Parkdale advances to the East Final.

East final
McGill declined the invitation to the East Final, making Toronto Parkdale the default winner. Toronto Parkdale advances to the Grey Cup.

Playoff bracket

Grey Cup Championship

References

 
Canadian Football League seasons